A chordate is an animal of the phylum Chordata. All chordates possess, at some point during their larval or adult stages, five synapomorphies, or primary physical characteristics, that distinguish them from all the other taxa. These five synapomorphies include a notochord, dorsal hollow nerve cord, endostyle or thyroid, pharyngeal slits, and a post-anal tail. The name “chordate” comes from the first of these synapomorphies, the notochord, which plays a significant role in chordate structure and movement. Chordates are also bilaterally symmetric, have a coelom, possess a circulatory system, and exhibit metameric segmentation.

In addition to the morphological characteristics used to define chordates, analysis of genome sequences has identified two conserved signature indels (CSIs) in their proteins: cyclophilin-like protein and mitochondrial inner membrane protease ATP23, which are exclusively shared by all vertebrates, tunicates and cephalochordates. These CSIs provide molecular means to reliably distinguish chordates from all other Metazoa.

Chordates are divided into three subphyla: Craniata (fish, amphibians, reptiles, birds, and mammals); Tunicata or Urochordata (sea squirts, salps); and Cephalochordata (which includes lancelets). The Craniata and Tunicata compose the clade Olfactores, which is sister to Cephalochordata. (See diagram under Phylogeny.) Extinct taxa such as Vetulicolia and Conodonta are Chordata, but their internal placement is less certain. Hemichordata (which includes the acorn worms) was previously considered a fourth chordate subphylum, but now is treated as a separate phylum: hemichordates and Echinodermata form the Ambulacraria, the sister phylum of the Chordates. The Chordata and Ambulacraria, together and possibly with the Xenacoelomorpha, form the superphylum Deuterostomia. 

Chordate fossils have been found from as early as the Cambrian explosion, 539 million years ago. Cladistically (phylogenetically), vertebrates – chordates with the notochord replaced by a vertebral column during development – are a subgroup of the clade Craniata, which consists of chordates with a skull.  Of the more than 81,000 living species of chordates, about half are ray-finned fishes that are members of the class Actinopterygii and the vast majority of the rest are tetrapods (mostly birds and mammals).

Anatomy

Chordates form a phylum of animals that are defined by having at some stage in their lives all of the following anatomical features:

A notochord, a stiff rod of cartilage that extends along the inside of the body. Among the vertebrate sub-group of chordates the notochord develops into the spine, and in wholly aquatic species this helps the animal to swim by flexing its tail.
A dorsal neural tube. In fish and other vertebrates, this develops into the spinal cord, the main communications trunk of the nervous system.
Pharyngeal slits. The pharynx is the part of the throat immediately behind the mouth. In fish, the slits are modified to form gills, but in some other chordates they are part of a filter-feeding system that extracts particles of food from the water in which the animals live. In tetrapods, they are only present during embryonic stages of the development.
Post-anal tail. A muscular tail that extends backwards behind the anus. In some chordates such as humans, this is only present in the embryonic stage.
An endostyle. This is a groove in the ventral wall of the pharynx. In filter-feeding species it produces mucus to gather food particles, which helps in transporting food to the esophagus. It also stores iodine, and may be a precursor of the vertebrate thyroid gland.

There are soft constraints that separate chordates from other biological lineages, but are not part of the formal definition:
 All chordates are deuterostomes. This means that, during the embryo development stage, the anus forms before the mouth.
 All chordates are based on a bilateral body plan.
 All chordates are coelomates, and have a fluid-filled body cavity called a coelom with a complete lining called peritoneum derived from mesoderm (see Brusca and Brusca).

Classification
The following schema is from the 2015 edition of Vertebrate Palaeontology. The invertebrate chordate classes are from Fishes of the World. While it is structured so as to reflect evolutionary relationships (similar to a cladogram), it also retains the traditional ranks used in Linnaean taxonomy.

 Phylum Chordata
 Subphylum Cephalochordata (Acraniata) – (lancelets; 30 species)
 Class Leptocardii (lancelets)
 Clade Olfactores
 Subphylum Tunicata (Urochordata) – (tunicates; 3,000 species)
 Class Ascidiacea (sea squirts)
 Class Thaliacea (salps)
 Class Appendicularia (larvaceans)
 Class Sorberacea
 Subphylum Vertebrata (Craniata) (vertebrates – animals with backbones; 66,100+ species)
 Superclass 'Agnatha' paraphyletic (jawless vertebrates; 100+ species)
 Class Cyclostomata
 Infraclass Myxinoidea or Myxini (hagfish; 65 species)
 Infraclass Petromyzontida or Hyperoartia (lampreys)
 Class †Conodonta
 Class †Myllokunmingiida
 Class †Pteraspidomorphi
 Class †Thelodonti
 Class †Anaspida
 Class †Cephalaspidomorphi
 Infraphylum Gnathostomata (jawed vertebrates)
 Class †Placodermi (Paleozoic armoured forms; paraphyletic in relation to all other gnathostomes)
 Class Chondrichthyes (cartilaginous fish; 900+ species)
 Class †Acanthodii (Paleozoic "spiny sharks"; paraphyletic in relation to Chondrichthyes)
 Class Osteichthyes (bony fish; 30,000+ species)
 Subclass Actinopterygii (ray-finned fish; about 30,000 species)
 Subclass Sarcopterygii (lobe-finned fish: 8 species)
 Superclass Tetrapoda (four-limbed vertebrates; 35,100+ species) (The classification below follows Benton 2004, and uses a synthesis of rank-based Linnaean taxonomy and also reflects evolutionary relationships. Benton included the Superclass Tetrapoda in the Subclass Sarcopterygii in order to reflect the direct descent of tetrapods from lobe-finned fish, despite the former being assigned a higher taxonomic rank.)
 Class Amphibia (amphibians; 8,100+ species)
 Class Sauropsida (reptiles (including birds); 21,300+ species – 10,000+ species of birds and 11,300+ species of reptiles)
 Class Synapsida (mammals; 5,700+ species)

Subphyla

Cephalochordata: Lancelets

Cephalochordates, one of the three subdivisions of chordates, are small, "vaguely fish-shaped" animals that lack brains, clearly defined heads and specialized sense organs. These burrowing filter-feeders compose the earliest-branching chordate sub-phylum.

Tunicata (Urochordata)

Most tunicates appear as adults in two major forms, known as "sea squirts" and salps, both of which are soft-bodied filter-feeders that lack the standard features of chordates. Sea squirts are sessile and consist mainly of water pumps and filter-feeding apparatus; salps float in mid-water, feeding on plankton, and have a two-generation cycle in which one generation is solitary and the next forms chain-like colonies. However, all tunicate larvae have the standard chordate features, including long, tadpole-like tails; they also have rudimentary brains, light sensors and tilt sensors. The third main group of tunicates, Appendicularia (also known as Larvacea), retain tadpole-like shapes and active swimming all their lives, and were for a long time regarded as larvae of sea squirts or salps. The etymology of the term Urochordata (Balfour 1881) is from the ancient Greek οὐρά (oura, "tail") + Latin chorda ("cord"), because the notochord is only found in the tail. The term Tunicata (Lamarck 1816) is recognised as having precedence and is now more commonly used.

Craniata (Vertebrata)

Craniates all have distinct skulls. They include the hagfish, which have no vertebrae. Michael J. Benton commented that "craniates are characterized by their heads, just as chordates, or possibly all deuterostomes, are by their tails".

Most craniates are vertebrates, in which the notochord is replaced by the vertebral column. These consist of a series of bony or cartilaginous cylindrical vertebrae, generally with neural arches that protect the spinal cord, and with projections that link the vertebrae. However hagfish have incomplete braincases and no vertebrae, and are therefore not regarded as vertebrates,
but as members of the craniates, the group from which vertebrates are thought to have evolved. However the cladistic exclusion of hagfish from the vertebrates is controversial, as they may be degenerate vertebrates who have lost their vertebral columns.

The position of lampreys is ambiguous. They have complete braincases and rudimentary vertebrae, and therefore may be regarded as vertebrates and true fish. However, molecular phylogenetics, which uses biochemical features to classify organisms, has produced both results that group them with vertebrates and others that group them with hagfish. If lampreys are more closely related to the hagfish than the other vertebrates, this would suggest that they form a clade, which has been named the Cyclostomata.

Phylogeny

Overview

There is still much ongoing differential (DNA sequence based) comparison research that is trying to separate out the simplest forms of chordates. As some lineages of the 90% of species that lack a backbone or notochord might have lost these structures over time, this complicates the classification of chordates. Some chordate lineages may only be found by DNA analysis, when there is no physical trace of any chordate-like structures.

Attempts to work out the evolutionary relationships of the chordates have produced several hypotheses. The current consensus is that chordates are monophyletic, meaning that the Chordata include all and only the descendants of a single common ancestor, which is itself a chordate, and that craniates' nearest relatives are tunicates. Recent identification of two conserved signature indels (CSIs) in the proteins cyclophilin-like protein and mitochondrial inner membrane protease ATP23, which are exclusively shared by all vertebrates, tunicates and cephalochordates also provide strong evidence of the monophyly of Chordata.

All of the earliest chordate fossils have been found in the Early Cambrian Chengjiang fauna, and include two species that are regarded as fish, which implies that they are vertebrates. Because the fossil record of early chordates is poor, only molecular phylogenetics offers a reasonable prospect of dating their emergence. However, the use of molecular phylogenetics for dating evolutionary transitions is controversial.

It has also proved difficult to produce a detailed classification within the living chordates. Attempts to produce evolutionary "family trees" shows that many of the traditional classes are paraphyletic.

Diagram of the evolutionary relationships of chordates

While this has been well known since the 19th century, an insistence on only monophyletic taxa has resulted in vertebrate classification being in a state of flux.

The majority of animals more complex than jellyfish and other Cnidarians are split into two groups, the protostomes and deuterostomes, the latter of which contains chordates. It seems very likely the  Kimberella was a member of the protostomes. If so, this means the protostome and deuterostome lineages must have split some time before Kimberella appeared—at least , and hence well before the start of the Cambrian .

 
Fossils of one major deuterostome group, the echinoderms (whose modern members include starfish, sea urchins and crinoids), are quite common from the start of the Cambrian, . The Mid Cambrian fossil Rhabdotubus johanssoni has been interpreted as a pterobranch hemichordate. Opinions differ about whether the Chengjiang fauna fossil Yunnanozoon, from the earlier Cambrian, was a hemichordate or chordate. Another fossil, Haikouella lanceolata, also from the Chengjiang fauna, is interpreted as a chordate and possibly a craniate, as it shows signs of a heart, arteries, gill filaments, a tail, a neural chord with a brain at the front end, and possibly eyes—although it also had short tentacles round its mouth. Haikouichthys and Myllokunmingia, also from the Chengjiang fauna, are regarded as fish. Pikaia, discovered much earlier (1911) but from the Mid Cambrian Burgess Shale (505 Ma), is also regarded as a primitive chordate. On the other hand, fossils of early chordates are very rare, since invertebrate chordates have no bones or teeth, and only one has been reported for the rest of the Cambrian.

The evolutionary relationships between the chordate groups and between chordates as a whole and their closest deuterostome relatives have been debated since 1890. Studies based on anatomical, embryological, and paleontological data have produced different "family trees". Some closely linked chordates and hemichordates, but that idea is now rejected. Combining such analyses with data from a small set of ribosome RNA genes eliminated some older ideas, but opened up the possibility that tunicates (urochordates) are "basal deuterostomes", surviving members of the group from which echinoderms, hemichordates and chordates evolved. Some researchers believe that, within the chordates, craniates are most closely related to cephalochordates, but there are also reasons for regarding tunicates (urochordates) as craniates' closest relatives.

Since early chordates have left a poor fossil record, attempts have been made to calculate the key dates in their evolution by molecular phylogenetics techniques—by analyzing biochemical differences, mainly in RNA. However, molecular estimates of dates often disagree with each other and with the fossil record, and their assumption that the molecular clock runs at a known constant rate has been challenged.

Traditionally, Cephalochordata and Craniata were grouped into the proposed clade "Euchordata", which would have been the sister group to Tunicata/Urochordata. More recently, Cephalochordata has been thought of as a sister group to the "Olfactores", which includes the craniates and tunicates. The matter is not yet settled.

A specific relationship between Vertebrates and Tunicates is also strongly supported by two CSIs found in the proteins predicted exosome complex RRP44 and serine palmitoyltransferase, that are exclusively shared by species from these two subphyla but not Cephalochordates, indicating Vertebrates are more closely related to Tunicates than Cephalochordates.

Cladogram 
Phylogenetic tree of the chordate phylum. Lines of the cladogram show probable evolutionary relationships between both extinct taxa, which are denoted with a dagger (†), and extant taxa. Relatives of vertebrates are invertebrates. The positions (relationships) of the lancelets, tunicates, and craniates/vertebrates are based on the following studies:

Closest nonchordate relatives

The closest relatives of the Chordates are the Hemichordates and Echinodermata, which together form the Ambulacraria.
The Chordata and Ambulacraria together form the superphylum Deuterostomia.

Hemichordates

Hemichordates ("half chordates") have some features similar to those of chordates: branchial openings that open into the pharynx and look rather like gill slits; stomochords, similar in composition to notochords, but running in a circle round the "collar", which is ahead of the mouth; and a dorsal nerve cord—but also a smaller ventral nerve cord.

There are two living groups of hemichordates. Each filter feeds by means of a pair of branched tentacles, and has a short, shield-shaped proboscis. The extinct graptolites, colonial animals whose fossils look like tiny hacksaw blades, lived in tubes similar to those of pterobranchs.

Echinoderms

Echinoderms differ from chordates and their other relatives in three conspicuous ways: they possess bilateral symmetry only as larvae – in adulthood they have radial symmetry, meaning that their body pattern is shaped like a wheel; they have tube feet; and their bodies are supported by skeletons made of calcite, a material not used by chordates. Their hard, calcified shells keep their bodies well protected from the environment, and these skeletons enclose their bodies, but are also covered by thin skins. The feet are powered by another unique feature of echinoderms, a water vascular system of canals that also functions as a "lung" and surrounded by muscles that act as pumps. Crinoids look rather like flowers, and use their feather-like arms to filter food particles out of the water; most live anchored to rocks, but a few can move very slowly. Other echinoderms are mobile and take a variety of body shapes, for example starfish, sea urchins and sea cucumbers.

History of name
Although the name Chordata is attributed to William Bateson (1885), it was already in prevalent use by 1880. Ernst Haeckel described a taxon comprising tunicates, cephalochordates, and vertebrates in 1866. Though he used the German vernacular form, it is allowed under the ICZN code because of its subsequent latinization.

See also

References

External links 

 
 Chordate on GlobalTwitcher.com
 Chordate node at Tree Of Life
 Chordate node at NCBI Taxonomy

 

Terreneuvian first appearances
Extant Cambrian first appearances
Taxa named by Ernst Haeckel